The following is a listing of the documentation available for Schofield Barracks on the Hawaiian island of Oahu, through the public-domain Historic American Buildings Survey (HABS) and Historic American Engineering Record (HAER). See separate lists for Pearl Harbor Naval Base, Hickam Air Force Base, and the former Barbers Point Naval Air Station.

HAER surveys

HABS surveys

Historic American Buildings Survey in Hawaii
Historic American Engineering Record in Hawaii